The 1924 United States presidential election in Delaware took place on November 4, 1924. All contemporary 48 states were part of the 1924 United States presidential election. State voters chose three electors to the Electoral College, which selected the president and vice president. 

Delaware was won by the Republican nominee, incumbent President Calvin Coolidge of Massachusetts, over the Democratic nominee, Ambassador John W. Davis of West Virginia. Coolidge ran with former Budget Director Charles G. Dawes of Illinois, while Davis ran with Governor Charles W. Bryan of Nebraska. Also in the running that year was the Progressive Party nominee, Senator Robert M. La Follette of Wisconsin and his running mate Senator Burton K. Wheeler of Montana.

Results

See also
 United States presidential elections in Delaware

References

Notes

Delaware
1924
1924 Delaware elections